The following places in the U.S. state of Minnesota are called Douglas:
Douglas County, Minnesota
Douglas, Olmsted County, Minnesota, an unincorporated community
Douglas Township, Dakota County, Minnesota
Point Douglas, Minnesota, a ghost town in Washington County